The 1933 Haskell Indians football team was an American football that represented the Haskell Institute—now known as Haskell Indian Nations University—as an independent during the 1933 college football season. Haskell compiled a record of 2–6–3.

After the 1932 season, William Henry Dietz resigned his post as Haskell's head coach to coach in the National Football League. Gus Welch, a full-blood Chippewa, was hired to replace him. Welch was assisted during the 1933 season by Egbert Ward and John Levi.

Key players included quarterback Ed Wapp of the Sac and Fox tribe, fullback Lofa Hayes of the Euchee tribe, and halfback Pete Cimino of the Chippewa tribe.

Orien Crow was elected as the team captain, but he left the team to play professional football. On November 2, halfback Oliver Duffina was elected to replace Crowe as captain for the remainder of the season.

Schedule

References

Haskell
Haskell Indian Nations Fighting Indians football seasons
Haskell Indians football